The following are public holidays in Kiribati. Dates refer to 2002.

References

Kiribati
Holidays
Law of Kiribati
Kiribati